The American Bearing Manufacturers Association is an industry trade group that deals with all aspects of bearing technology.  It was founded in 1917 as an informal group of manufacturers with the purpose of aiding bearing manufacturing during World War I. 1933 saw the ratification of Articles of Incorporation, by the then current members, as the Anti-Friction Bearing Manufacturers Association (AFBMA). In 1934 the AFBMA was incorporated as an organization in New York City. In 1993 the organization formally changed its title to the American Bearing Manufacturers Association in order to better serve its members and to expand membership eligibility.

See also
 ABEC scale - a tolerance classification developed by the ABMA's Annular Bearing Engineering Committee
 Ball (bearing)

References

External links
ABMA

Trade associations based in the United States
Organizations established in 1934